The black-throated babbler (Stachyris nigricollis) is a species of bird in the family Timaliidae. It is found in Brunei, Indonesia, Malaysia, Singapore, and Thailand. Its natural habitats are subtropical or tropical moist lowland forest and subtropical or tropical swampland. It is threatened by habitat loss.

References

Collar, N. J. & Robson, C. 2007. Family Timaliidae (Babblers)  pp. 70 – 291 in; del Hoyo, J., Elliott, A. & Christie, D.A. eds. Handbook of the Birds of the World, Vol. 12. Picathartes to Tits and Chickadees. Lynx Edicions, Barcelona.

black-throated babbler
Birds of the Malay Peninsula
Birds of Malesia
black-throated babbler
Taxonomy articles created by Polbot